Rømø is a Danish island in the Wadden Sea. Rømø is part of Tønder Municipality. The island had 650 inhabitants as of 1 January 2011, and covers an area of 129 km².

Rømø is the southernmost of Denmark's Wadden Sea Islands. This distinction was previously held by the small uninhabited island of Jordsand, which sank in 1999.

History 
Rømø is part of Southern Jutland, a historical region of Denmark. With the Second Schleswig War (1864), the region became part of Prussia (and later the German Empire) as part of the Province of Schleswig-Holstein. Rømø and the rest of Southern Jutland was reunited with Denmark in 1920, after the Schleswig plebiscites.

Between 1970 and 2006, Rømø was part of Skærbæk Municipality (da) in South Jutland County. Since 2007 it has been part of Tønder Municipality in the Region of Southern Denmark.

Features 
It is linked to the Danish mainland by a road running across a causeway, and the island lies about 3 km from the neighbouring German island Sylt, to which it is connected by ferry. It is home to a number of small communities such as Kongsmark, Østerby, Lakolk, and Sønderstrand.

St Clement's Church 
Is the main church in the island.  In the 19th century, the church allowed people to buy name plates for the church benches. Here the name of H.P.P. Møller, grandfather of the founder of the famous Danish Maersk shipping company, can still be seen on one of the front benches.

Kommandørgård Museum 
The museum contains artefacts from the whaling industry including a whale skeleton. The house is from 1770 and the barn and stable are from 1744. From 1784 to 1874 part of the manor was a school. "Kommandør" (commander) is an older term for a captain of a Whaler.

Ferry to Sylt 
The car ferry to the neighbouring (German) island of Sylt is operated by Syltferry. It runs every hour and takes about 35 minutes.

The beach  
You can drive your car legally onto the beach. On the southern beach you can go kitebuggying - using a small vehicle pulled at high speed pulled by a large, wind-blown kite. On the first weekend on September, one of the biggest kite festivals of Europe is held on Rømø. Rømø is a popular spot for tourists attracted by the nudist beaches.

Notable people 
 Peter Mærsk Møller (1836 in Rømø – 1927)  was a sea captain who perhaps is best known as the father of Arnold Peter Møller, founder of the Maersk corporation,

See also
 List of Danish islands
 Nearby islands: Mandø, Fanø, Sylt (German island).
 Nearby towns: Esbjerg, Ribe, Skærbæk, Tønder

Notes

Gallery

External links 

 Rømø (tourist website, English).
 Cycle Route round the island (tourist website, English).
 Further Tourist Information (German).

 
Danish Wadden Sea Islands
Islands of Denmark
Geography of Tønder Municipality